Phil for Short is a 1919 American silent comedy film directed by Oscar Apfel and starring Evelyn Greeley. It was produced and distributed by World Film Company.

Cast

Preservation
A print of Phil for Short is housed in the Library of Congress collection.

References

External links

1919 films
American silent feature films
Films directed by Oscar Apfel
World Film Company films
American black-and-white films
1919 comedy films
Silent American comedy films
1910s American films